Dovenby Lodge railway station was on the single track Derwent Branch of the Maryport and Carlisle Railway (M&CR) in the then county of Cumberland, now Cumbria, England.

The station was opened in 1867. It was a private station solely for the use of the Ballentine-Dykes family of Dovenby Lodge, one of whom was Chairman of the Maryport and Carlisle Railway in the 1840s.

The station is variously referred to as "Dovenby", "Dovenby Park" and "Dovenby Lodge"; an image of a ticket bearing the name Dovenby Lodge is included in the standard work on non-public stations. Letters exchanged in 1868 between the family and the railway concern a parcel of land and a lodge at the station.

The station was available for use until the line closed in 1935, though it never appeared in public timetables. Unusually for those times the tracks were lifted not long after closure, with a tragic consequence; when a bridge was being demolished a girder fell on two men and killed them.

Afterlife
In 2020 the station was in use as a dwelling.

See also

 Maryport & Carlisle Railway
 Whitehaven, Cleator and Egremont Railway
 Cleator and Workington Junction Railway
 Cockermouth & Workington Railway

References

Sources

Further reading

External links
 The station on an Edwardian OS map National Library of Scotland
 The station Rail Map Online
 The station on the branch, with mileages Railway Codes

Disused railway stations in Cumbria
Former Maryport and Carlisle Railway stations
Railway stations in Great Britain opened in 1867
Railway stations in Great Britain closed in 1935
Private railway stations